Stefano Desideri (born 3 July 1965) is an Italian football coach and a former professional player who played as a midfielder.

Desideri was born in Rome, and played for Italy at the 1988 Summer Olympics.

Honours
Roma
 Coppa Italia: 1985–86, 1990–91

External links
Stefano Desideri – Player profile

1965 births
Living people
Footballers from Rome
Italian footballers
Association football midfielders
Serie A players
Serie B players
Serie C players
Italy under-21 international footballers
Olympic footballers of Italy
Footballers at the 1988 Summer Olympics
Italian football managers
Piacenza Calcio 1919 players
A.S. Roma players
Inter Milan players
Udinese Calcio players
U.S. Livorno 1915 players
Pol. Monterotondo Lupa players